Barringtonia macrostachya grows as a shrub or tree up to  tall, with a trunk diameter of up to . The bark is brown, greenish yellow, greyish brown or brown mottled grey. The specific epithet macrostachya is from the Greek meaning "large spike", referring to the inflorescence. Habitat is riverine and swamp forest, from sea level to  altitude. Local medicinal uses include the treatment of ringworm, sore eyes and stomach aches. B. macrostachya has been used as fish poison. It is found in China, Burma, Thailand, Vietnam, Malaysia, Brunei, Indonesia and the Philippines.

References

macrostachya
Medicinal plants of Asia
Flora of China
Flora of Indo-China
Flora of Malesia
Plants described in 1820